Below is a partial list of Minor League Baseball players in the New York Yankees system.

Players

Clayton Beeter

Clayton Howard Beeter (born October 9, 1998) is an American professional baseball pitcher in the New York Yankees organization. He played college baseball at Texas Tech.

Beeter attended Birdville High School in North Richland Hills, Texas, where he played football and baseball. In 2017, his senior year, he compiled a 0.81 ERA and 106 strikeouts over 55 innings alongside batting .417 with two home runs. Undrafted in the 2017 Major League Baseball draft, he enrolled at Texas Tech University to play college baseball.

Beeter suffered an arm injury in the fall of freshman year at Texas Tech, and underwent Tommy John surgery, thus forcing him to miss the 2018 season. He returned healthy as a redshirt freshman in 2019, going 0–3 with a 3.48 ERA over  relief innings, striking out forty. In 2020, his redshirt sophomore season, Beeter moved into the starting rotation, and was named the starting pitcher for Texas Tech's season opener. Beeter went 2–1 with a 2.14 ERA over four starts before the college baseball season was cut short due to the COVID-19 pandemic.

Beeter was selected by the Los Angeles Dodgers in the second round with the 66th overall pick of the 2020 Major League Baseball draft. He signed with the Dodgers for $1.2 million. He did not play a minor league game in 2020 since the season was cancelled due to the COVID-19 pandemic. To begin the 2021 season, he was assigned to the Great Lakes Loons of the High-A Central. On July 24, Beeter pitched two innings of a combined no-hitter against the Lake County Captains alongside Bobby Miller, Jake Cantleberry, and Cameron Gibbens. After making 22 starts and pitching to a 0–4 record, a 3.13 ERA, and 55 strikeouts over  innings, he was promoted to the Tulsa Drillers of the Double-A Central in mid-August. Making five starts with Tulsa, Beeter went 0–2 with a 4.80 ERA over 15 innings. He returned to Tulsa to begin the 2022 season.

On August 2, 2022, Beeter was traded to the New York Yankees in exchange for Joey Gallo. He was assigned to the Somerset Patriots of the Double-A Eastern League. Over 25 games (23 starts) between Tulsa and Somerset, Beeter went 0–3 with a 4.56 ERA and 129 strikeouts over 77 innings.

Texas Tech Red Raiders bio

Sean Boyle

Sean Boyle (born October 29, 1996) is an American professional baseball pitcher in the New York Yankees organization.

Boyle grew up in Selden, New York and attended Newfield High School.

Boyle didn't start playing baseball until his Junior year at Newfield High School. Boyle began his college baseball career at Suffolk County Community College. He played for coach Eric Brown with the Suffolk County Community College Sharks for two seasons before transferring to Dallas Baptist University with coach Dan Heefner. As a senior for the Dallas Baptist Patriots, Boyle made 21 appearances with two starts and went 1–1 with a 3.60 ERA and 40 strikeouts over 35 innings pitched.
 
Boyle was selected by the New York Yankees in the 25th round of the 2018 Major League Baseball Draft. He signed with the team and received a $10,000 signing bonus. After signing with the team Boyle was assigned to the Gulf Coast League Yankees as a reliever and struck out 20 batters over 15 innings pitched.

He began the 2019 season with the Pulaski Yankees before earning a promotion to the Class A Short Season Staten Island Yankees after posting a 1.88 ERA with 32 strikeouts in  innings pitched.

Boyle did not play in a game in 2020 due to the cancellation of the minor league season because of the COVID-19 pandemic.

He began the 2021 season with the Low-A Tampa Tarpons, where he began to transition from a reliever to a starter before being promoted to the High-A Hudson Valley Renegades where in his first start, threw a combined no-hitter for Hudson Valley Renegades, their first in 20 years. He then was promoted to the Triple-A Scranton/Wilkes-Barre RailRiders. where in his first start in AAA, threw a complete game no-hitter against the WooSox in their new stadium. Boyle was named AAA International League pitcher of the week for the week of 9/22/21. Boyle had risen through 4 levels of the minor leagues in 2021 and threw 2 no-hitters that year. Boyle was later sent to the Double-A Somerset Patriots before being assigned back to Scranton/Wilkes-Barre.

To begin 2022, he pitched 2 innings in 3/20/22 Yankees MLB spring training game allowing no runs. To start the 2022 season he was assigned to AA Somerset in order to get more innings for his continued conversion to a full time starting pitcher. He was named the Eastern League Pitcher of the Week for 7/17 and Eastern League of the Month for July. He was also named 2022 Pitcher of the year  voted by Somerset fans. Boyle had a record 10 straight quality starts at AA Somerset, the longest streak by any minor leaguer since 2019 before he was promoted to Scranton/Wilkes-Barre at the beginning of August. In 2022, Boyle ranked 2nd of all minor league pitchers in number of innings pitched, at 151.1. He also was tied for 2nd of all minor league pitchers in wins, and 13th in strikeouts with 160 strikeouts.

Suffolk County Community bio
Dallas Baptist Patriots bio

Josh Breaux

Joshua Breaux (born October 7, 1997) is an American professional baseball catcher in the New York Yankees organization.

Breaux attended Tomball High School in Tomball, Texas and played college baseball at McLennan Community College. In 2017, he played collegiate summer baseball with the Falmouth Commodores of the Cape Cod Baseball League. Breaux was drafted by the Houston Astros in the 36th round of the 2017 Major League Baseball draft but did not sign and returned to McLennan. The next year he was drafted by the New York Yankees in the second round of the 2018 MLB draft.

Breaux made his professional debut with the Gulf Coast Yankees before being promoted to the Staten Island Yankees. He played 2019 with the Charleston RiverDogs. He did not play for a minor league team during the 2020 because the season was cancelled due to the COVID-19 pandemic, but did play five games in the Constellation Energy League. Breaux started 2021 with the Hudson Valley Renegades before being promoted to the Somerset Patriots.

Jhony Brito

Jhony Rafael Brito (born February 17, 1998) is a Dominican professional baseball pitcher in the New York Yankees organization.

Brito signed with the New York Yankees as an international free agent in November 2015. He made his professional debut in 2016 with the Dominican Summer League Yankees.

The Yankees added him to their 40-man roster after the 2022 season. Brito was optioned to the Triple-A Scranton/Wilkes-Barre RailRiders to begin the 2023 season.

Andrés Chaparro

Andrés Alfonso Chaparro (born May 4, 1999) is a Venezuelan professional baseball third baseman in the New York Yankees organization.

Chaparro signed with the New York Yankees as an international free agent in 2015. He made his professional debut in 2016 with the Dominican Summer League Yankees. He played 2017 with the Pulaski Yankees and the Staten Island Yankees in 2018 and 2019.

Chaparro did not play for a team in 2020 due to the Minor League Baseball season being cancelled because of the Covid-19 pandemic. He returned in 2021 to play for the 
Tampa Tarpons and Hudson Valley Renegades. After the season, he played in the Arizona Fall League. Chaparro played 2022 with the Florida Complex League Yankees, Tampa Tarpons and Somerset Patriots.

Carson Coleman

Carson Cavanagh Coleman (born April 7, 1998) is an American professional baseball pitcher in the New York Yankees organization.

Coleman attended Lexington Catholic High School in Lexington, Kentucky and played college baseball at the University of Kentucky. In 2018 and 2019, he played collegiate summer baseball with the Brewster Whitecaps of the Cape Cod Baseball League. He was drafted by the Tampa Bay Rays in the 33rd round of the 2019 Major League Baseball Draft, but did not sign and returned to Kentucky for another season. He signed with the New York Yankees as an undrafted free agent after he was not selected in the 2020 Major League Baseball draft, which was shortened because of the Covid-19 pandemic.

Coleman made his professional debut in 2021 with the Tampa Tarpons. He started 2022 with the Hudson Valley Renegades before being promoted to the Somerset Patriots.

Indigo Diaz

Indigo Dunham Diaz (born October 14, 1998) is a Canadian professional baseball pitcher in the New York Yankees organization.

Diaz played Little League baseball with the Forest Hills team, then participated in the British Columbia Premier Baseball League as a member of the North Shore Twins and Coquitlam Reds. He attended Handsworth Secondary School, and continued playing baseball. Diaz began his collegiate baseball career at Iowa Western Community College, where he pitched two seasons, then transferred to the Michigan State Spartans baseball team. In the midst of his junior season with the Spartans, Diaz became the team's closer. Diaz was subsequently selected by the Atlanta Braves in the 27th round of the 2019 Major League Baseball draft. Diaz started his professional career with the Gulf Coast League Braves after signing with the Atlanta Braves organization. Due to the COVID-19 pandemic the 2020 minor league season was cancelled. Diaz began the 2021 season at the High-A level with the Rome Braves. He threw 18 walks over 18 relief appearances, spanning 27 innings.  Diaz was promoted to the Mississippi Braves in July 2021. Diaz spent the 2022 season with Mississippi, and was traded to the New York Yankees, alongside Caleb Durbin, for Lucas Luetge. 

Michigan State Spartans bio
Diaz at Iowa Western: 1 and 2

Elijah Dunham

Elijah Zechariah Dunham (born May 29, 1998) is an American professional baseball outfielder in the New York Yankees organization.

Dunham attended FJ Reitz High School in Evansville, Indiana and played college baseball at Indiana University. As a sophomore at Indiana in 2019, he batted .310 with eight home runs, 29 RBIs, and 44 runs scored over 43 games. After the season, he was selected by the Pittsburgh Pirates in the 40th round of the 2019 Major League Baseball draft but did not sign. He started all 15 games as a junior in which he batted .390 before the season was cancelled due to the COVID-19 pandemic. He went unselected in the shortened 2020 Major League Baseball draft, and signed with the New York Yankees as an undrafted free agent.

Dunham made his professional debut in 2021 with the Tampa Tarpons of the Low-A Southeast and was promoted to the Hudson Valley Renegades of the High-A East in June. Over 93 games between the two clubs, Dunham slashed .263/.362/.463 with 13 home runs, 57 RBIs, 25 doubles and 28 stolen bases. Following the season's end, he was selected to play in the Arizona Fall League (AFL) for the Surprise Saguaros where he was named to the Fall Stars game. Dunham ended the AFL hitting .357/.465/.571 with two home runs and 11 stolen bases over 23 games, earning himself the Breakout Player of the Year award. For the 2022 season, he was assigned to the Somerset Patriots of the Double-A Eastern League. Over 110 games, he slashed .248/.348/.448 with 17 home runs, 63 RBIs, and 37 stolen bases.

Yoendrys Gómez

Yoendrys Adrian Gómez (born October 15, 1999) is a Venezuelan professional baseball pitcher in the New York Yankees organization.

Gómez signed with the New York Yankees organization as an international free agent on July 2, 2016. Gómez played his first professional season the following year, splitting the season between the Dominican Summer League Yankees and the GCL Yankees, pitching to a cumulative 0–3 record and 5.40 ERA in 11 games between the two teams. In 2018, Gómez returned to the two teams, recording a 4–1 record and 2.08 ERA in 12 appearances. In 2019, Gómez split the season between the rookie-level Pulaski Yankees and the Single-A Charleston RiverDogs, posting a 4–5 record and 3.99 ERA with 53 strikeouts in 56.1 innings of work. He did not play a minor league game in 2020 since the season was cancelled due to the COVID-19 pandemic. The Yankees added him to their 40-man roster after the 2020 season.

Gómez was assigned to the Single-A Tampa Tarpons to begin the 2021 season. Pitching for the Somerset Patriots in 2022, Gómez pitched the first five innings of a combined seven-inning no-hitter on September 7.

Gómez was assigned to Double-A Somerset to begin the 2023 season after allowing one run in five innings pitched during Spring Training.

Zach Greene

Zachary Blue Greene (born August 29, 1996) is an American professional baseball pitcher in the New York Yankees organization.

Greene attended Atlantic Coast High School and St. Johns River State College. He was selected by the Miami Marlins in the 15th round of the 2018 MLB Draft. Instead of signing, he transferred to the University of South Alabama, where he was named a second-team All-American. The New York Yankees selected Greene in the eighth round, 255th overall, in the 2019 MLB draft.

The New York Mets selected Greene from the Yankees in the 2022 Rule 5 draft. On March 12, 2023, Greene was removed from the 40-man roster and placed on outright waivers. Greene was returned to the Yankees organization on March 14.

Tyler Hardman

Tyler Ryan Hardman (born January 27, 1999) is an American professional baseball first baseman and third baseman in the New York Yankees organization.

Hardman attended Temescal Canyon High School in Lake Elsinore, California. He was drafted by the Colorado Rockies in the 37th round of the 2017 Major League Baseball Draft, but did not sign and played college baseball at the University of Oklahoma. After four years at Oklahoma, he was drafted by the New York Yankees in the fifth round of the 2021 MLB draft, and signed.

Hardman spent his first professional season with the Florida Complex League Yankees and Tampa Tarpons. He played 2022 with Hudson Valley Renegades and Somerset Patriots. After the season, he played in the Arizona Fall League.

Justin Lange

Justin Craig Lange (born September 11, 2001) is an American professional baseball pitcher in the New York Yankees organization.

Lange attended Llano High School in Llano, Texas, where he played baseball. He committed to play college baseball at Dallas Baptist University. Lange was selected by the San Diego Padres with the 34th overall pick in the 2020 Major League Baseball draft. Lange signed with the Padres on June 24 for a $2 million bonus.

Lange did not play a minor league game in 2020 due to the cancellation of the minor league season caused by the COVID-19 pandemic. He made his professional debut in 2021 with the Rookie-level Arizona Complex League Padres. Over nine starts, he pitched to a 0–3 record, a 6.95 ERA, 29 strikeouts, and 15 walks over 22 innings.

On March 18, 2022, the Padres traded Lange to the New York Yankees for Luke Voit.

Brandon Lockridge

Brandon Marcus Lockridge (born March 14, 1997) is an American professional baseball outfielder in the New York Yankees organization.

Lockridge attended Pensacola Catholic High School in Pensacola, Florida and played college baseball at Troy University. In 2017, he played collegiate summer baseball with the Wareham Gatemen of the Cape Cod Baseball League. He was drafted by the New York Yankees in the fifth round of the 2018 Major League Baseball draft.

Lockridge made his professional debut with the Gulf Coast Yankees before being promoted to the Staten Island Yankees. He played 2019 with the Charleston RiverDogs. He did not play for a minor league team during the 2020 because the season was cancelled due to the COVID-19 pandemic. Lockridge started 2021 with the Hudson Valley Renegades before being promoted to the Somerset Patriots.

Brando Mayea

Brando Mayea  is an Cuban professional baseball outfielder in the New York Yankees organization.

Mayea was born in Cuba. He primarily played shortstop as a youth before being moved to the outfield.

Mayea was signed by the New York Yankees on January 16, 2023, and received a $4.35 million signing bonus.

Everson Pereira

Everson Jose Pereira (born April 10, 2001) is a Venezuelan professional baseball outfielder in the New York Yankees organization.

Pereira signed with the New York Yankees as an international free agent in July 2017.

After the 2021 season, the Yankees added him to their 40-man roster. Pereira spent the 2022 season split between the High-A Hudson Valley Renegades and the Double-A Somerset Patriots, logging a combined .277/.350/.469 slash with 14 home runs, 56 RBI, and 21 stolen bases across 102 games.

He was assigned to Double-A Somerset to begin the 2023 season, after going 4-for-12 with a pair of doubles and three walks in big-league camp.

Jeisson Rosario

Jeisson Antonio Rosario (born October 22, 1999) is a Dominican professional baseball center fielder in the New York Yankees organization.

Rosario signed with the San Diego Padres as an international free agent in July 2016. He made his professional debut in 2017 with the rookie-level Arizona League Padres, batting .299 with one home run and 24 RBIs in 52 games. In 2018, he played for the Class A Fort Wayne TinCaps, appearing in 117 games while compiling a .271 average with three home runs and 34 RBIs. In 2019, Rosario played 120 games for the Class A-Advanced Lake Elsinore Storm, batting .242 with three home runs and 35 RBIs.

On August 30, 2020, Rosario and infielder Hudson Potts were traded to the Boston Red Sox in exchange for Mitch Moreland. Although he did not play during 2020 due to cancellation of the minor league season, Rosario was invited to participate in the Red Sox' fall instructional league. On November 20, 2020, he was added to the 40-man roster. Rosario spent the 2021 season in Double-A with the Portland Sea Dogs, appearing in 98 games while batting .232 with three home runs and 36 RBIs. He played in the Dominican Professional Baseball League (LIDOM) during the offseason.

On March 23, 2022, Rosario was designated for assignment by the Red Sox following the signing of Trevor Story.

On March 26, 2022, Rosario was claimed off of waivers by the New York Yankees. He was then optioned to the Double-A Somerset Patriots. He was designated for assignment on April 6, 2022. He cleared waivers and was sent outright to Somerset on April 9.

SoxProspects scouting report

Matt Sauer

Matthew David Sauer (born January 21, 1999) is an American professional baseball pitcher in the New York Yankees organization.

Sauer attended Righetti High School in Santa Maria, California. As a senior, he went 9–1 with a 0.98 earned run average (ERA) and 142 strikeouts. He committed to the University of Arizona to play college baseball. Sauer was drafted by the New York Yankees in the second round of the 2017 Major League Baseball draft.

Sauer officially signed with the Yankees on June 24. and was assigned to the Gulf Coast League Yankees, where he spent the whole 2017 season, posting an 0–2 record with a 5.40 ERA in  innings pitched. In 2018, he pitched with the Staten Island Yankees where he went 3–6 with a 3.90 ERA in 13 starts and 67 innings.

Sauer spent 2019 with the Charleston RiverDogs, but pitched only  innings due to injury. He did not play a minor league game in 2020 since the season was cancelled due to the COVID-19 pandemic. Sauer split the 2021 season between the Tampa Tarpons and the Hudson Valley Renegades, appearing in 23 games (21 starts) and going 5–6 with a 4.69 ERA and 127 strikeouts over  innings. Sauer began the 2022 season with Hudson Valley and was promoted to the Somerset Patriots in August. He struck out 17 batters in a game on August 25.

Mitch Spence

Mitch Perry Spence (born May 6, 1998) is an American professional baseball pitcher for the New York Yankees organization.

Spence attended Green Hope High School in Cary, North Carolina, and played on the school's baseball team. He enrolled at the University of South Carolina (USC) Aiken, where he played college baseball for the USC Aiken Pacers. Spence was twice named the Peach Belt Conference's pitcher of the week.

The New York Yankees selected Spence in the 10th round, with the 315th overall selection, of the 2019 MLB draft. The Yankees invited Spence to spring training as a non-roster player in 2023.

Randy Vásquez

Randy Marcelino Vásquez (born November 3, 1998) is a Dominican professional baseball pitcher in the New York Yankees organization.

Vásquez signed with the New York Yankees as an international free agent in May 2018. He spent his first professional season with the Dominican Summer League Yankees and Gulf Coast Yankees. He spent 2019 with the Pulaski Yankees.

Vásquez did not play in 2020 due to the Minor League Baseball season being cancelled due to the Covid-19 pandemic. In 2021 he pitched for the Tampa Tarpons, Hudson Valley Renegades and Somerset Patriots. He started 2022 with Somerset. In the Eastern League championship game, Vásquez pitched eight innings of a combined no-hitter.

Vásquez was optioned to the Triple-A Scranton/Wilkes-Barre RailRiders to begin the 2023 season.

Trystan Vrieling

Trystan Vrieling (born October 2, 2000) is an American baseball pitcher in the New York Yankees organization. He played college baseball for the Gonzaga Bulldogs.

Vrieling grew up in Kennewick, Washington and attended Kamiakin High School. He was named the Mid-Columbia Conference Pitcher of the Year as a senior.

Vrieling played college baseball at Gonzaga Bulldogs for three seasons. He made five appearances during his freshman season and had a 1.08 ERA in  innings pitched. As a sophomore, Vrieling had a 1–3 record with a 3.88 ERA and 66 strikeouts in  innings pitched over 22 appearances. He moved to the Bulldogs' starting rotation prior to the start of his junior season and went 4–4 with a 4.91 ERA and 107 strikeouts.

Vrieling was selected in the third round by the in the 2022 Major League Baseball draft by the New York Yankees. He signed with the team on July 28, 2022, and received a $611,400 signing bonus.

Gonzaga Bulldogs bio

Will Warren

Willian Harper Warren (born June 16, 1999) is an American professional baseball pitcher for the New York Yankees organization.

Warren is from Brandon, Mississippi. He attended Jackson Preparatory School in Flowood, Mississippi, graduating in 2017, and Southeastern Louisiana University, where he played college baseball for the Southeastern Louisiana Lions. The New York Yankees selected Warren in the eighth round, with the 243rd overall selection, of the 2021 MLB draft. He made his professional debut in 2022 with the Hudson Valley Renegades of the High-A South Atlantic League. He had a 3.60 earned run average and 42 strikeouts in 35 innings pitched before the Yankees promoted him to the Somerset Patriots of the Double-A Eastern League in May.

Full Triple-A to Rookie League rosters

Triple-A

Double-A

High-A

Single-A

Rookie

Foreign Rookie

See also
List of New York Yankees minor league affiliates

References

Lists of minor league baseball players
Minor league players